The United States census of 1810 was the third census conducted in the United States. It was conducted on August 6, 1810. It showed that 7,239,881 people were living in the United States, of whom 1,191,362 were slaves.

The 1810 census included one new state: Ohio. The original census returns for the District of Columbia, Georgia, Mississippi, New Jersey, and Ohio were lost or destroyed over the years. Most of Tennessee's original forms were also lost, other than Grainger and Rutherford counties.

This was the first census in which New York was ranked as the most populous state, if excluding West Virginia from Virginia. Otherwise this would be the last census with Virginia ranked as the most populous state.

Census questions
The 1810 census form contained the following information (identical to the 1800 census):

 City or township
 Name of the head of family
 Number of free white males under age 10
 Number of free white males age 10 to under 16
 Number of free white males age 16 to under 26
 Number of free white males age 26 to under 45
 Number of free white males age 45 and over
 Number of free white females under age 10
 Number of free white females age 10 to under 16
 Number of free white females age 16 to under 26
 Number of free white females age 26 to under 45
 Number of free white females age 45 and over
 Number of all other free persons
 Number of slaves

Note to researchers

Census taking was not yet an exact science. Before 1830, enumerators lacked pre-printed forms, and some drew up their own, resulting in pages without headings. Some enumerators did not tally their results. As a result, census records for many towns before 1830 are idiosyncratic. This is not to suggest that they are less reliable than subsequent censuses, but that they may require more work on the part of the researcher.

Data availability
No microdata from the 1810 population census are available, but aggregate data for small areas, together with compatible cartographic boundary files, can be downloaded from the National Historical Geographic Information System.

State rankings

City rankings

References

External links
 Historic US Census data 
 1810 Census of Population and Housing official reports 

United States Census, 1810
United States census
United States